Vinkovački Banovci is a village in Croatia in the region of Syrmia. The village is a part of the Nijemci Municipality.

Serbian community constitute majority of the local population. The word Vinkovački in the name is an adjective derived from the name of the city of Vinkovci used to distinguish the village from the adjacent village of Banovci. Two villages are closely intertwined, sharing some local institutions and postal code. Banovci village itself developed as the new village of Vinkovački Banovci and in local vernacular they are known as Stari Banovci (Old Banovci for Vinkovački Banovci) and Novi Banovci (New Banovci for Šidski Banovci).

Name
The name of the village in Croatian or Serbian is plural.

History
The village was mentioned for the first time in 15th century. In 1473 the village under the name of Zavrakinci is mentioned to be on the small uplift just northwest of the village. First Serb settlers settled in Banovci during the reign of Charles VI, Holy Roman Emperor. Serb settlers at that time came from modern day Montenegro and from the region around Peć in Kosovo. In 1745 Slavonian Military Frontier was established in the region.

Education
The village hosts a local branch of the Ilača-Banovci Elementary School. Vinkovački Banovci branch school organizes classes between the first and the fourth grade, after which most of the pupils continue their education either in Banovci (entirely in Serbian language and with additional Serb cultural curriculum) or in Ilača (in Croatian language and without additional curriculum).

Languages
Due to the local minority population, the Nijemci municipality allows the use of not only Croatian as the official language, but the Serbian language and Serbian Cyrillic alphabet as well in Vikovački Banovci.

Gallery

References

Populated places in Vukovar-Syrmia County
Populated places in Syrmia
Serb communities in Croatia